Farm No. 266—Johnny Cash Boyhood Home was the home of singer-songwriter Johnny Cash from 1935 to 1950. Cash moved with his family to a rural community in Mississippi County, Arkansas. The farm house was built in 1934 in a government project to help boost the economy. The Cash family joined the community in March of 1935. Ray and Carrie Cash moved to Arkansas when they took an offer to farm government land for poor and impoverished farmers. The Cash family went through many hard ships while living in the farm house by floods and losing one of their children, Jack Cash. Growing up picking cotton and working on the farm influenced some of Johnny Cash's songs in the future, one of them being "Pickin' Time." In 2018, the home was listed on the National Register of Historic Places.

History 
In March 1935, when American musician Johnny Cash was three years old, the family settled in Dyess, Arkansas, a New Deal colony of the Franklin Roosevelt administration. Dyess Colony was founded in Mississippi county in 1934 to give poor families a chance to work land that they had a chance to own. The colony was named after William Reynolds Dyess, a Mississippi native, and the first Arkansas WPA administrator. Dyess gave the idea of supplying farms to families in poverty to Harry Hopkins, and then named the first "Colonization Project No 1." 16,000 acres in Mississippi County were given to this project for 500 different families to come farm on. Families started arriving in October 1934. The Cash family settled in March of 1935 on 20 acres. The house given to the Cash family is one of few left standing in the Dyess Colony.

J.R., as Cash was known as a child, started working in his father's cotton fields at the age of five, singing along with his family while working. He lived there until he graduated from high school in 1950. All families in Dyess colony depended on cotton. None were sharecroppers so the idea of one day purchasing their farms from the government was real. The government eventually stopped funding the scheme, but the Cash family continued farming at the property. 

Arkansas State University acquired the home in 2011, and the university's Heritage Sites Office operates it as a small museum, "Historic Dyess Colony: Johnny Cash Boyhood Home", as of 2022. It was listed on the National Register of Historic Places in 2018.

J.R. Cash growing up 
Johnny Cash was born to Ray, and Carrie Cash on February 26, 1932. J.R was the fourth born of seven kids to the Cash family. J.R was three years old when the family packed up and moved to their new home, Farm No. 266. The Great Depression was a tragedy at this time, but along with the Great Depression came floods and natural disasters. In 1937 the Mississippi and Ohio Rivers flooded. The flood was so bad on the Cash family, they had to evacuate. Everyone but Ray Cash left to go to Kingsland; until it was safe to return. Along with natural disasters and the Great Depression, the Cash family went through a horrific event. On May 20, 1944 Jack Cash died. Jack was J.Rs older brother. Jack was 15 years old when he fell into a table saw on the Cash's farm. Jack pulled himself to the side of the barn where he laid until he passed away.

Incorporating the farm house into his music 

Johnny Cash used his experiences at the farm house growing up in many of his songs. One important song that was inspired from the farm house is, "Pickin' Time". 

The family farm was flooded on at least two occasions, which inspired his song "Five Feet High and Rising".

Gallery

See also
House of Cash
Carter Family Fold

References

Further reading

External links
  
 Boyhood Home in Dyess, 360o Tour, ArkansasOnline

National Register of Historic Places in Mississippi County, Arkansas
Houses completed in 1934
1934 establishments in Arkansas
Houses in Mississippi County, Arkansas
Historic house museums in Arkansas
Museums in Mississippi County, Arkansas
University museums in Arkansas
Arkansas State University
Biographical museums in Arkansas
Boyhood Home
Country music museums
New Deal in Arkansas
Arkansas culture